Timmis may refer to:

People
 Adrian Timmis, English cyclist
 Brian Timmis, Canadian footballer
 Mercer Timmis, Canadian footballer
 Peter Timmis, English cricketer
 Steve Timmis, Australian executive

Other
 Timmis system, used in railway rolling stock
 Timmis (car), manufactured by the Timmis Motor Company

See also
 Timis (disambiguation)